Gerardo Díaz Ferrán (Madrid, 1942) is a Spanish Businessman.

He was co-owner with Gonzalo Pascual of Grupo Marsans that was sold in June 2010. He was from 2007 until 2010 president of CEOE, the Spanish business community.

After the bankruptcy of all his companies, on November 29, 2010, the Madrid Business court number 5, filed the personal Chapter 11 to Gerardo Díaz Ferrán.

In December 2012 he was arrested and charged with concealment of assets and money laundering and since held in prison.

References

External links 
 Confederación Española de Organizaciones Empresariales

1942 births
Living people
People from Madrid
Businesspeople from Madrid
Spanish prisoners and detainees